Bertil Alexis "Totta" Nyström (born 22 May 1935) is a retired Greco-Roman wrestler from Sweden. He competed at the 1960, 1964 and 1968 Olympics and won a bronze medal in 1964. He also won two medals at the world championships of 1961 and 1963 and six national titles. Starting from 1973 he coached the national wrestling team.

References

External links
 

1935 births
Living people
Olympic wrestlers of Sweden
Wrestlers at the 1960 Summer Olympics
Wrestlers at the 1964 Summer Olympics
Wrestlers at the 1968 Summer Olympics
Swedish male sport wrestlers
Olympic bronze medalists for Sweden
Olympic medalists in wrestling
World Wrestling Championships medalists
Medalists at the 1964 Summer Olympics
20th-century Swedish people